Jur, also known as Luwo (Luo, Dheluwo), is a language spoken by the Luwo people of Bahr el Ghazal region in South Sudan. The language is predominantly spoken in the western and northern parts of Bahr el Ghazal. 

The language is part of the Luo languages of East Africa and is especially related to the languages of South Sudan such as Anyuak and Päri with whom it forms a dialect cluster.

Etymology 
The Luwo language is spoken by the Luwo (or Jur Col), an ethnic group in South Sudan. Jur is exonym adopted from the local Dinka language whose speakers are the Luwo's northern and eastern neighbours. Its original Dinka usage, non-cattle-holding non-Dinka, was not particular to the Jur. Jur Col ("black Jur") is today used to disambiguate Luwo from other Jur groups.

Status 
Dhe Luwo is currently a developing language. Meaning that the language is developing its written language, standard dialect and undergoing modernization.

Sample phrases

References

Luo languages
Languages of South Sudan